Poyntonophrynus lughensis is a species of toad in the family Bufonidae. It is found in Somalia, northern and eastern Kenya, eastern, central and southern Ethiopia, and extreme southeastern South Sudan. Its natural habitat is very dry savanna. It breeds after the beginning of the rains in temporarily flooded hollows, including roadside ditches. The main threat to this species environmental degradation caused by human expansion and settlement, with increased populations of livestock as a consequence.

References

lughensis
Frogs of Africa
Amphibians of Ethiopia
Amphibians of Kenya
Amphibians of Somalia
Vertebrates of South Sudan
Taxa named by Arthur Loveridge
Amphibians described in 1932
Taxonomy articles created by Polbot